This page is a list of all the matches that Algeria national football team has played between 1980 and 1989.

1980

1981

1982

1983

1984

1985

1986

1987

1988

1989

Notes

References 

Algeria national football team results (1980–1989)

External links
Algeria: Fixtures and Results – FIFA.com

1980s in Algeria
1980-89
1979–80 in Algerian football
1980–81 in Algerian football
1981–82 in Algerian football